Sheryl Denise Swoopes (born March 25, 1971) is an American former professional basketball player. She was the first player to be signed in the WNBA, is a three-time WNBA MVP, and was named one of the league's Top 15 Players of All Time at the 2011 WNBA All-Star Game. Swoopes has won three Olympic gold medals and is one of eleven women's basketball players to have won an Olympic gold medal, an NCAA Championship, a Fiba world cup gold, and a WNBA title. She was elected to the Naismith Memorial Basketball Hall of Fame in 2016. In 2017, she was inducted into the Women's Basketball Hall of Fame.

Early success
Born in Brownfield, Texas, Swoopes was raised by her mother, Louise Swoopes, and played basketball with her three older brothers. She began competing at age seven in a local children's league called Little Dribblers. She played basketball at Brownfield High School.

College years
Initially recruited by the University of Texas, Swoopes left the school shortly after her arrival without playing a game and enrolled at South Plains College. After playing at South Plains for two years, Swoopes transferred to Texas Tech, near her hometown.

In 1993, Swoopes won the NCAA women's basketball championship with the Texas Tech Lady Raiders during her senior season. Her jersey was retired by the school the following year, making her one of only three Lady Raiders to be honored in this way. The others are Carolyn Thompson and Krista Kirkland, Swoopes' teammate from the 1993 championship team.

As of 2010, Swoopes was still a part of the women's basketball record books in many categories, including single-game scoring record (53 points on March 13, 1993 vs. Texas, tied for tenth place), single-season scoring (955 points in the 1993 season, fourth place), highest championship tournament scoring average (35.4 in the 1993 tournament, second place), best single-game championship scoring performance (47 points vs. Ohio State, 1993 championship), which broke Bill Walton's record, and scoring record for championship series (177 points, five games). She set the record for the most field goals in the championship game with 16.

Swoopes also set several school records at Texas Tech. She scored 955 in the 1992–93 season, which is an all-time scoring record for a single season (as of 2006). Swoopes' 24.9 points-per-game average for her career is the best in school history; she also boasts three triple-doubles and 23 double-doubles, 14 of which came during her senior year.

Swoopes was the 1993 winner of the Naismith College Player of the Year award, the Honda Sports Award,  was selected as that year's WBCA Player of the Year, and was chosen to the Division I All-American squad in both 1992 and 1993. Swoopes was named the 1993 Sportswoman of the Year (in the team category) by the Women's Sports Foundation.

Texas Tech statistics
Source

USA Basketball
Swoopes was named to the USA national team and competed in the 1994 World Championships, held in June 1994 in Sydney, Australia. The team was coached by Tara VanDerveer, and won their first six games, when they faced Brazil. In a closely contested, high-scoring game, Brazil hit 10 of 10 free throws in the final minute to secure a 110–107 victory. The USA won a close final game against Australia 100–95 to earn the bronze medal. Swoopes averaged 9.1 points per game, while recording seven steals, second-highest on the team.

Swoopes was selected to represent the US at the 1995 USA Women's Pan American Games, but only four teams committed to participate, so the event was cancelled.

Swoopes continued as a member of the USA team at the 1996 Olympics, held in Atlanta, Georgia. The USA team won all their pool play games by large margins, although they were behind Cuba by as many as seven points before Lisa Leslie's 24 points helped the USA take over the game. 

In 2002, Swoopes was named to the national team which competed in the World Championships in Zhangjiagang, Changzhou, and Nanjing, China. The team was coached by Van Chancellor. Swoopes scored 16.9 points per game, second-highest on the team and recorded a team-high 24 steals. The USA team won all nine games, including a close title game against Russia, which had a one-point difference late in the game.

Swoopes was named to the National Team representing the US at the 2006 World Championships, held in Barueri and Sao Paulo, Brazil. The team won eight of their nine contests, but the lone loss came in the semifinal medal round to Russia. The USA beat Brazil in the final game to earn the bronze medal. Swoopes, hampered by injuries, averaged 3.0 points per game and was second on the team with six blocks.

WNBA career

Swoopes was recruited for the Houston Comets of the WNBA during the 1997 inaugural season. She returned only six weeks after giving birth to her son to play the last third of the WNBA inaugural season and led the Comets in the 1997 WNBA Championship. As a member of the Houston Comets, she accumulated over 2,000 career points, 500 career rebounds, 300 career assists, and 200 career steals. Her extraordinary scoring and defensive ability made her the first three-time WNBA MVP (2000, 2002, and 2005) and the first three-time WNBA Defensive Player of the Year (2000, 2002, and 2003). Swoopes is a four-time WNBA champion (1997–2000).

Swoopes is the second player in WNBA history to win both the regular season MVP award and the All-Star Game MVP award in the same season. The first player to accomplish this was Lisa Leslie. Swoopes is also the first player in WNBA history to record a triple-double in both the regular season and the playoffs.

Swoopes gained national prominence when she won the gold medal with the USA Basketball Women's National Team  at the 1996 Olympic Games and became a focal point of the fledgling WNBA. The 1996 Olympic win over Brazil (117–87) is considered by some to be the "best woman's basketball game they'd ever seen." She is a three-time Olympic gold medalist (1996, 2000, and 2004).

Swoopes is the first women's basketball player to have a Nike shoe named after her: the "Air Swoopes".

On March 3, 2008, Swoopes signed with the Seattle Storm, ending her 11-year career with the Houston Comets. She was waived by the Storm on February 3, 2009.

Two days after her 40th birthday in 2011, sources for the Associated Press claimed that Swoopes was preparing to return to the WNBA in anticipation of an official signing announcement from the Tulsa Shock. At the 2011 WNBA All-Star Game, she was announced as one of the top 15 players in the 15-year history of the WNBA.

On August 26, 2011, the 40-year-old Swoopes hit a buzzer-beating shot to edge the Los Angeles Sparks 77–75 and end the Shock's WNBA-record 20-game losing streak.

Swoopes became an unrestricted free agent after the 2011 season: Tulsa Shock owner Steve Swetoha announced on 15 February 2012 that the team did not intend to offer Swoopes a new contract. As of the beginning of the 2012 preseason on 5 May, Swoopes remained an unsigned free agent. While no official announcement has been made, when Swoopes began blogging at the Shape magazine website during the 2012 Olympic Summer Games, she identified herself as "a former professional basketball player." In 2016, she was voted into the WNBA Top 20@20, in celebration of the league's 20th anniversary.

International career

Europe
 1993–1994 :  Basket Bari
 2004–2005 :  VBM-SGAU Samara
 2005–2006 :  Taranto Cras Basket
 2010:  Esperides Kallitheas

Post-playing career
In 2008, Sheryl Swoopes made an appearance on Shirts & Skins, a reality series on Logo TV. Swoopes mentored the San Francisco Rockdogs, a gay basketball team, and shared her experiences on basketball, family, faith, and coming out.

In 2010, Swoopes was an assistant basketball coach at Mercer Island High School in Washington.

Swoopes was a color analyst for the Texas Tech women's basketball broadcast during the 2012–2013 season.

In 2013, Swoopes became head coach of the Loyola University Chicago women's basketball team. In April 2016, Loyola announced that it was investigating Swoopes of alleged mistreatment, after the school newspaper reported that 10 of the team's players have either transferred or want a release from their scholarships. On July 4, 2016, Loyola announced it had fired Swoopes as a result of the investigation but declined to say what it had found.

In July 2017, Swoopes returned to her alma mater, Texas Tech, hired as the women's basketball program's Director of Player Development, where her job included resuming work as broadcast color analysis for Lady Raiders games. Following the firing of head coach Candi Whitaker on January 1, 2018, Swoopes was promoted to regular assistant coach under interim head coach Shimmy Gray-Miller.

Personal life
Swoopes was married from June 1995 to 1999 to her high school sweetheart, with whom she has one son, Jordan Eric Jackson (b. 1997).

In October 2005, Swoopes announced she was gay, becoming one of the highest-profile athletes in a team sport to do so publicly. Swoopes said, "it doesn't change who I am. I can't help who I fall in love with. No one can. ... Discovering I'm gay just sort of happened much later in life. Being intimate with [Alisa] or any other woman never entered my mind. At the same time, I'm a firm believer that when you fall in love with somebody, you can't control that." She and her partner, former basketball player and Houston Comets assistant coach Alisa Scott, together raised Swoopes' son. The couple broke up in 2011. Later that year, Swoopes got engaged to Chris Unclesho, a longtime male friend; the couple wed after a long engagement on July 21, 2017.

Awards and honors
Swoopes won the female Associated Press Athlete of the Year award in 1993. The same year, she also won the Honda Sports Award for basketball and the WBCA Player of the Year award. She was named one of the 20 female athletes of the decade for 2000 to 2010 by Sports Illustrated. She was named an LGBT History Month Icon by the Equality Forum.

WNBA career statistics

Regular season

|-
|style="text-align:left;background:#afe6ba;"|  1997†
| style="text-align:left;"| Houston
| 9 || 0 || 14.3 || .472 || .250 || .714 || 1.7 || 0.8 || 0.8 || 0.4 || 0.44 || 7.1
|-
|style="text-align:left;background:#afe6ba;"| 1998†
| style="text-align:left;"| Houston
| 29 || 29 || 32.3 || .427 || .360 || .826 || 5.1 || 2.1 || 2.5 || 0.5 || 2.00 || 15.6
|-
|style="text-align:left;background:#afe6ba;"|  1999†
| style="text-align:left;"| Houston
| 32 || 32 || 34.4 || .462 || .337 || .820 || 6.3 || 4.0 || 2.4 || 1.4 || 2.59 || 18.3
|-
|style="text-align:left;background:#afe6ba;"|  2000†
| style="text-align:left;"| Houston
| 31 || 31 || 35.2 || .506 || .374 || .821 || 6.3 || 3.8 || style="background:#D3D3D3"|2.8° || 1.1 || 2.65 || style="background:#D3D3D3"|20.7°
|-
| style="text-align:left;"| 2002
| style="text-align:left;"| Houston
| 32 || 32 || 36.1 || .434 || .288 || .825 || 4.9 || 3.3 || 2.8 || 0.7 || 2.72 || 18.5
|-
| style="text-align:left;"| 2003
| style="text-align:left;"| Houston
| 31 || 30 || 35.0 || .406 || .304 || .887 || 4.6 || 3.9 || style="background:#D3D3D3"|2.5° || 0.8 || 2.35 || 15.6
|-
| style="text-align:left;"| 2004
| style="text-align:left;"| Houston
| 31 || 31 || 34.5 || .422 || .308 || .856 || 4.9 || 2.9 || 1.5 || 0.5 || 1.90 || 14.8
|-
| style="text-align:left;"| 2005
| style="text-align:left;"| Houston
| 33 || 33 || style="background:#D3D3D3"|37.1° || .447 || .360 || .850 || 3.6 || 4.3 || 2.0 || 0.8 || 2.18 || style="background:#D3D3D3"|18.6°
|-
| style="text-align:left;"| 2006
| style="text-align:left;"| Houston
| 31 || 31 || style="background:#D3D3D3"|35.8° || .413 || .278 || .764 || 5.9 || 3.7 || 2.1 || 0.3 || 2.39 || 15.5
|-
| style="text-align:left;"| 2007
| style="text-align:left;"| Houston
| 3 || 3 || 35.3 || .360 || .143 || 1.000 || 5.7 || 3.7 || 1.7 || 0.3 || 3.00 || 7.7
|-
| style="text-align:left;"| 2008
| style="text-align:left;"| Seattle
| 29 || 25 || 24.3 || .391 || .222 || .695 || 4.3 || 2.1 || 1.5 || 0.3 || 1.07 || 7.1 
|-
| style="text-align:left;"| 2011
| style="text-align:left;"| Tulsa
| 33 || 28 || 29.9 || .398 || .319 || .870 || 4.1 || 2.3 || 0.8 || 0.3 || 1.36 || 8.2
|-
| style="text-align:left;"| Career
| style="text-align:left;"|12 years, 3 teams
| 324 || 205 || 32.7 || .436 || .316 || .825 || 4.9 || 3.2 || 2.0 || 0.7 || 2.09 || 15.0

Postseason

|-
|style="text-align:left;background:#afe6ba;"| 1997†
| style="text-align:left;"| Houston
| 2 || 0 || 7.0 || .000 || .000 || .000 || 1.5 || 0.0 || 0.0 || 0.5 || 0.00 || 0.0
|-
|style="text-align:left;background:#afe6ba;"| 1998†
| style="text-align:left;"| Houston
| 5 || 5 || 37.6 || .443 || .278 || .933 || 10.0 || 5.2 || 1.8 || 1.4 || 3.20 || 14.6
|-
|style="text-align:left;background:#afe6ba;"| 1999†
| style="text-align:left;"| Houston
| 6 || 6 || 36.0 || .358 || .308 || .929 || 3.7 || 1.2 || 2.3 || 0.5 || 2.00 || 14.7
|-
|style="text-align:left;background:#afe6ba;"|  2000†
| style="text-align:left;"| Houston
| 6 || 6 || 36.7 || .471 || .471 || .793 || 5.7 || 3.2 || 2.8 || 0.0 || 2.00 || 18.8
|-
| style="text-align:left;"| 2002
| style="text-align:left;"| Houston
| 3 || 3 || style="background:#D3D3D3"|42.3° || .397 || .333 || .800 || 7.3 || 5.7 || 4.0 || 0.7 || 2.67 || style="background:#D3D3D3"|24.3
|-
| style="text-align:left;"| 2003
| style="text-align:left;"| Houston
| 3 || 3 || 36.7 || .435 || .100 || .938 || 6.3 || 4.3 || 1.3 || 0.7 || 1.67 || 18.7
|-
| style="text-align:left;"| 2005
| style="text-align:left;"| Houston
| 5 || 5 || 37.8 || .402 || .357 || .810 || 5.6 || 3.8 || 1.4 || 0.4 || 3.00 || 18.4
|-
| style="text-align:left;"| 2006
| style="text-align:left;"| Houston
| 2 || 2 || 31.0 || .389 || .167 || .875 || 2.5 || 1.5 || 1.0 || 1.0 || 1.00 || 11.0
|-
| style="text-align:left;"| 2008
| style="text-align:left;"| Seattle
| 3 || 2 || 24.0 || .320 || .200 || .889 || 3.3 || 1.0 || 2.0 || 0.0 || 1.67 || 8.7
|-
| style="text-align:left;"| Career
| style="text-align:left;"|9 years, 2 teams
| 35 || 32 || 34.3 || .406 || .293 || .861 || 5.5 || 3.1 || 2.0 || 0.5 || 2.14 || 15.5

Head coaching record

See also
 List of WNBA players

References

Further reading

External links

Loyola bio
WNBA listing

1971 births
Living people
African-American basketball players
All-American college women's basketball players
American expatriate basketball people in Greece
American expatriate basketball people in Italy
American expatriate basketball people in Russia
American women's basketball coaches
American women's basketball players
Basketball coaches from Texas
Basketball players at the 1996 Summer Olympics
Basketball players at the 2000 Summer Olympics
Basketball players at the 2004 Summer Olympics
Basketball players from Texas
Bisexual sportspeople
Bisexual women
Goodwill Games medalists in basketball
High school basketball coaches in the United States
Houston Comets players
LGBT African Americans
LGBT basketball players
LGBT people from Texas
American LGBT sportspeople
Loyola Ramblers women's basketball coaches
Medalists at the 1996 Summer Olympics
Medalists at the 2000 Summer Olympics
Medalists at the 2004 Summer Olympics
Olympic gold medalists for the United States in basketball
People from Brownfield, Texas
Seattle Storm players
Small forwards
South Plains Lady Texans basketball players
Texas Tech Lady Raiders basketball coaches
Texas Tech Lady Raiders basketball players
Tulsa Shock players
Women's National Basketball Association All-Stars
Competitors at the 1994 Goodwill Games
21st-century African-American sportspeople
21st-century African-American women
20th-century African-American sportspeople
20th-century African-American women
United States women's national basketball team players